The Balm ruins (German: Ruine Balm or Ruine Balmfluh) are the remains of a fortified cave dwelling at the foot of Balmfluh (alternative spelling: Balmflue) in the Jura Mountains, in the municipality of Balm bei Günsberg in the Canton of Solothurn. It is that canton's only cave stronghold and one of the few in Switzerland. It is a Swiss heritage site of national significance.

Layout 

The wet rock face was covered with a lining wall; and the rest was a simple two-story timber construction, which is shown evident by the presence of holes into which beams were inserted. While being restored, the presently visible wall openings were distorted from their original form. Presumably this was a defensive fortification of some farming complex.

The entrance to the stone fortress stretched over a long, partly walled rise which is partly hewn from the rock. The connection between the forecourt and the fortress itself is still only incompletely reconstructed. The present-day rise is of modern source, and only partly represents its original state.

Excavations from the years 1939 and 1941 indicate that the place had been used as a habitation since early times.

Gallery

Bibliography 

 Fritz Hauswirth: Die schönsten Burgen und Schlösser der Schweiz. Neptun, Kreuzlingen 1977, S. 240–242
 Bruno Amiet: Die Burgen und Schlösser des Kantons Solothurn [Die Burgen und Schlösser der Schweiz, volume III]. Basel 1930.
 Emil Erdin: Burgen der Schweiz, Band 7, Silva-Verlag, Zürich 1981

References

External links 
 Ruine Balm auf der Website der Gemeinde
 

Cultural property of national significance in the canton of Solothurn
Castles in the canton of Solothurn
Cave castles in Switzerland